The Wisemen is a hip hop group formed by Wu-Tang Clan affiliate Bronze Nazareth and his brother, the lyricist and producer Kevlaar 7, who died on December 23, 2014 from a blood disorder.

Music career
They are known for soulful, jazzy, gritty instrumentals and polished, dense, thought-provoking lyrics depicting life in the city of Detroit, Michigan. The group consists of emcee/producer Bronze Nazareth, emcee/producer Kevlaar 7, and emcees Phillie, Salute the Kid, Illah Dayz, and June Megalodon. The latter two artists did not appear on the group's debut album.

2007: Wisemen Approaching 
The group released their debut album, Wisemen Approaching, on February 27, 2007 which featured Wu-Tang Clan member GZA as well as Killah Priest, Vast Aire, Planet Asia, Prodigal Sunn, and more. The album was fully produced by Wisemen members, and siblings, Bronze Nazareth and Kevlaar 7.

2010: Children of a Lesser God 
Their second album entitled Children of a Lesser God was released on October 26, 2010 and features guest appearances by Raekwon, Planet Asia, Big Rube of The Dungeon Family, and more. The album features production from Bronze Nazareth and Kevlaar 7, as well as live instrumentation from the band Project Lionheart.

Discography

Albums

Wisemen Approaching (Babygrande Records, 2007)
Children of a Lesser God (Babygrande Records, 2010)

American hip hop groups
Midwest hip hop groups